"(We Want) The Same Thing" is a song by American singer Belinda Carlisle. Written by Rick Nowels and Ellen Shipley, it was produced by Nowels for Carlisle's third album Runaway Horses (1989). It was released as the album's fifth single in the United Kingdom on October 1, 1990. To help promote the single in the UK, Virgin Records released a deluxe 12-inch vinyl boxed set with free stickers and a picture disc single on CD, in addition to standard formats. The single peaked at number six on the UK Singles Chart and spent 10 weeks in the top 75.

Single remix
The single version of "(We Want) The Same Thing" is different than the original version found on Runaway Horses. The intro of the single version includes chants of 'Hey!' repeated four times before a drum piece introduces the song. In the Runaway Horses album booklet, the lyrics listed for "(We Want) The Same Thing" vary from the actual version on the album but match the lyrics for the single version.

Track listings
CD single
 "(We Want) The Same Thing" (summer remix) — 4:17
 "Circle in the Sand" (sandblast multi-mix)
 "Shades of Michaelangelo" — 5:50

12-inch single
 "(We Want) The Same Thing" (extended summer remix) — 5:13
 "Circle in the Sand" (sandblast multi-mix)

7-inch single
 "(We Want) The Same Thing" (extended summer remix) — 5:13
 "Shades of Michaelangelo" — 5:50

Charts

References

1989 songs
1990 singles
Belinda Carlisle songs
Song recordings produced by Rick Nowels
Songs written by Ellen Shipley
Songs written by Rick Nowels
Virgin Records singles